State Route 316 (SR 316), also known as University Parkway, or Georgia 316, is a  state highway that exists in the northern part of the U.S. state of Georgia. It links the Atlanta metropolitan area with Athens, home of the University of Georgia.

The first  of the state highway is a freeway, but the rest of the route is at-grade with traffic signals with the exception of its junction with SR 81 east of Bethlehem.

Despite SR 316 being concurrent with US 29 for most of its route, the road is nearly always referred to by its state route designation, while US 29 is usually associated with its original route.

SR 316 could possibly be extended as a freeway from its Buford Drive exit to the Athens Perimeter on its current route, intersecting roads like Winder Highway (US 29 Business), Sugarloaf Parkway (current interchange), SR 81 (Loganville Highway), SR 53 (Hog Mountain Road), and US 78/SR 10 (current interchange).

Route description

Gwinnett County
SR 316 begins at an interchange with Interstate 85 (I-85) exit 106, west of Lawrenceville. The route heads east, and then northeast, to interchanges with SR 120, Riverside Parkway, Sugarloaf Parkway, and Collins Hills Road/SR 20/SR 124, all in Lawrenceville. Then the route becomes an at-grade highway. Northeast of the city is a major intersection: US 29/SR 8 come in from the west and intersect SR 316. At the intersection, SR 8 continues to the northeast, concurrent with US 29 BUS, while SR 316 has a concurrency with US 29. From then on, the speed limit is raised from 55 to 65 miles per hour. GA 316 continues to head east into rural Gwinnett County. Next, there is an interchange with the Sugarloaf Parkway freeway extension. The last major intersection is at Harbins Road. Finally, the road heads over the Appalachee River into rural Barrow County.

Barrow County

South of Winder, the two routes meet SR 81 at an interchange. To the east, at Bethlehem, is an intersection with SR 11. Then they encounter SR 53 southeast of Winder and at Statham they intersect SR 211.

Oconee County
Southeast of Bogart, the two routes intersect US 78/SR 10, which come in from the southwest. At the intersection, SR 10 continues to the northeast, concurrent with US 78 BUS, while the US 78 mainline joins the US 29/SR 316 concurrency. US 29/US 78/SR 316 intersect SR 10 Loop/SR 422 (Paul Broun Parkway/Athens Perimeter Highway) southwest of Athens. Here, SR 316 has its eastern terminus, while US 29/US 78 join SR 10 Loop/SR 422 in a concurrency to the east.

History
The first portion of the highway was completed as a freeway to Lawrenceville in 1960, after the city was bypassed by I-85. With the subsequent expansion of Atlanta into its eastern suburbs, travel between the capital and Athens became increasingly difficult as highways US 29 and US 78 were both routed through multiple business districts. Over the next decades, the state completed SR 316 in sections, weaving along the original route of US 29 in order to bypass communities and business districts, including Winder and the congested Atlanta Highway in Athens. On October 22, 2020, the highway's junction with SR 81 was upgraded to an interchange. The project to upgrade the junction cost 26.4 million dollars.

Gwinnett junction with I-85
In 2006, the Georgia Department of Transportation upgraded the interchange of I-85 and SR 316 with new bridges and collector/distributor (C/D) lanes involving Pleasant Hill Road, Boggs Road, and State Route 120. By utilizing one of these flyover bridges, drivers travelling westbound on SR 316 can access Pleasant Hill Road independently from I-85 southbound traffic. Another flyover built carried two new lanes of traffic going towards Atlanta on I-85 from SR 316. An HOV-only lane was converted to an express lane in 2011.

Future
SR 316 is scheduled to receive a number of improvements resulting in the entire route becoming a limited-access highway. This includes projects at SR 53 and SR 11. GDOT is planning on constructing a new interchange at Harbins Road in 2019 and hopes to have it open to traffic in 2021.

Major intersections

See also

References

External links

SR 316 at southeastroads.com
Pictures of Termini of SR 316
I-85/SR 316 Interchange Reconstruction

316
Transportation in Athens, Georgia
Transportation in Gwinnett County, Georgia
Transportation in Barrow County, Georgia
Transportation in Oconee County, Georgia